James Bacalles (born March 26, 1949) is a former member of the New York State Assembly, for the 136th district first elected in 1995. He is a Republican. Prior to his election to the assembly he served as mayor of Corning. He served on the Steuben County Board of Supervisors and then the Steuben County Legislature from 1980 till 1989.

Bacalles unsuccessfully sought the Republican nomination for the New York State Senate 53rd District seat held by George Winner; the nomination went to Tom O'Mara, who also went on to win the general election. As a result, Bacalles could not seek re-election to his seat in the Assembly, and Phil Palmesano was elected to take his place.

References

Living people
1949 births
Republican Party members of the New York State Assembly
Mayors of places in New York (state)
Politicians from Corning, New York
21st-century American politicians